163 Erigone is an asteroid from the asteroid belt and the namesake of the Erigone family of asteroids that share similar orbital elements and properties. It was discovered by French astronomer Henri Joseph Perrotin on April 26, 1876, and named after one of the two Erigones in Greek mythology. The orbital plane is inclined at an angle of 4.8° to the plane of the ecliptic.

Erigone is a relatively large and dark asteroid with an estimated size of 73 km. Based upon its spectrum, it is classified as a C-type asteroid, which indicates that it probably has a carbonaceous composition. It is the largest member of the eponymously named Erigone collisional family.

2014 occultation of Regulus

In the early morning hours of March 20, 2014, Erigone occulted the first-magnitude star Regulus, as first predicted by Aldo Vitagliano in 2004 using the SOLEX software.  This would have been a rare case of an occultation of a very bright star visible from a highly populated area, since the shadow path moved across New York state and Ontario, including all five boroughs of New York City. Observers in the shadow path would have seen the star wink out for as long as 14 seconds.

However, heavy clouds and rain blocked the view for most if not all people on the shadow path.  The website of the International Occultation Timing Association does not list any successful observations at all.

Two single chord Asteroid Occultation events have been observed, in 2013 and 2015.

References

External links
 
 

Erigone asteroids
Erigone
Erigone
C-type asteroids (Tholen)
Ch-type asteroids (SMASS)
20140320
18760426
Objects observed by stellar occultation

vec:Lista de asteroidi#163 Erigona